Mirsad "Miro" Alilović (born 28 February 1977) is a Slovenian professional basketball coach who is an assistant coach for Cedevita Olimpija of the Slovenian League, ABA League and the EuroCup.

Coaching career 
Alilović coached Slovenian clubs Geoplin Slovan and Union Olimpija.

On 10 April 2019, Alilović was named as a head coach for Serbian club Dynamic Belgrade. In February 2021, Dynamic Belgrade parted ways with him.

References

External links
 Coach Profile 1 at eurobasket.com
 Coach Profile 2 at eurobasket.com

1977 births
Living people
KK Dynamic coaches
KK Olimpija coaches
Slovenian expatriate basketball people in Serbia
Slovenian basketball coaches
Slovenian people of Bosnia and Herzegovina descent
Place of birth missing (living people)